Tummaville is a rural locality in the Toowoomba Region, Queensland, Australia.

History 
The locality's name is derived from the parish name, allegedly an Aboriginal corruption of the name Domville referring to pastoralist Domville Taylor who was in the area in the 1840s.

Tummaville State School opened on 19 January 1880. It closed in 1962.

St Paul's Anglican Church is on the corner of Church Road and Grasstree Road. It was dedicated on 25 February 1891 by Bishop William Thomas Thornhill Webber and was closed circa 1985. The cemetery to the side of the church is now operated by the Toowoomba Regional Council.

References

Further reading

 
 

Toowoomba Region
Localities in Queensland